Visa requirements for Hungarian citizens are administrative entry restrictions imposed on citizens of Hungary by the authorities of other states.

 Hungarian citizens had visa-free or visa on arrival access to 184 countries and territories, ranking the Hungarian passport 9th in terms of travel freedom according to the Henley Passport Index.

Historical perspective
Travel restrictions have been considerably relaxed since the end of communism and the removal of Hungary's border fence with Austria in May 1989.

During the communist era, travelling to the West was a long and difficult process for Hungarian citizens. The first step was to obtain an invitation, preferably from a relative in the country to be visited, and a promise of full financial support. With such an invitation, and assuming a passport could be obtained, a Hungarian could travel westwards once a year. However, in the absence of such an invitation, travel to the West was possible only once every three years. The Communist-era visa restrictions restricted Hungarian artists and musicians since it hindered their ability to travel abroad. As a result, many chose to leave Hungary and settle in the West, such as famed cellist János Starker, who emigrated to the United States in 1948 because it was impossible for him to tour abroad with a Hungarian passport.

Domestic events in Hungary have affected the visa requirements imposed on Hungarian citizens by Western countries. The Revolution of 1956 and the ensuing domestic repression resulted in the United States deciding to expedite all Hungarian visa requests.

The end of communism in 1989 led to a rapid relaxation of visa restrictions. Visa-free travel for Hungarians was introduced by several countries, including Sweden in 1986, the United Kingdom in 1990, Germany in 1990, France (1990), Spain in 1990, Belgium in 1991 South Korea in 1991  and Chile in 1992. 1993 saw Israel, South Africa, Portugal and Tunisia abolish the requirement for ordinary Hungarian tourists to obtain visas in advance of departure. Canada  and Slovakia followed in 1994. Italy waived prior visas in 1995, Mexico in 1997, Austria in 1997, Japan (1997), Slovenia (1998), Panama (1998), Morocco (1999). New Zealand scrapped requirements for visas in 2000  followed by Croatia that same year, and Brazil in 2001, Hong Kong in 2002, Serbia in 2003, Ukraine in 2003 and Peru later that same year of 2003.

Despite the tremendous increase in the number of visa waiver agreements, there have also been setbacks. In June 2001, the visa-free travel agreement between Hungary and Russia came to an end, and both countries now require visas of one another's citizens.

 Hungary's accession to the European Union on 1 May 2004, along with its fellow V4 companions, radically boosted reciprocal visa-free arrangements.

Hungarians can now not only travel visa-free to any member state of the EU, but also have a right to settle there. A valid Hungarian passport or identity card is sufficient for any stay shorter than three months. For periods longer than three months, a residence permit is needed. Hungarians are allowed to settle in any EU country for more than three months if they work or study there, or if they are financially self-sufficient. By virtue of the agreement on the European Economic Area (EEA), those rights also apply to Hungarians in Iceland, Norway and Liechtenstein. The same rights also extend to Hungarians in Switzerland as a result of the Agreement on the Free Movement of Persons. Following the accession to the European Union in 2004 and the Schengen Area in 2007, visa requirements were also lifted by several other countries including Georgia (2005), Bosnia and Herzegovina (2005), North Macedonia (2005), Colombia (2005), Moldova (2007), Botswana (2008), Taiwan (2008), and Thailand (2011).

The Hungarian government's decade-long efforts to have U.S. visa requirements abolished for Hungarian citizens finally came to fruition on 17 November 2008 when the United States decided to include Hungary in its Visa Waiver Program. The inclusion of Hungary in the Visa Waiver Program was considered a major event there. Kinga Göncz, the country's then foreign minister, even went as far as to describe it as "a landmark in our relations [with the United States], since the visa waiver was essentially the single unresolved issue." However, Hungarian President László Sólyom, who had promised upon his election in 2005 never to visit the United States as long as fingerprint requirements were part of U.S. visa procedures, refused to sign the agreement on the U.S. Visa Waiver Program, fearing it would give the United States too much access to Hungary's criminal registry. His refusal did not affect Hungary's inclusion in the program.

Visa requirements for Hungarian citizens were lifted by Qatar (July 2012), Kyrgyzstan (July 2012), Armenia (January 2013), Jamaica (March 2013), Turkey (February 2014), Papua New Guinea (March 2014), Bahrain (October 2014), the United Arab Emirates (May 2015), Timor-Leste (May 2015), Samoa (May 2015), Indonesia (June 2015), Kazakhstan (July 2015), São Tomé and Príncipe (August 2015), Tonga (November 2015), Palau (December 2015), Marshall Islands (June 2016), Tuvalu (July 2016), Solomon Islands (October 2016), Belarus (February 2017), Cape Verde (1 January 2019), Uzbekistan (1 February 2019), Oman (December 2020).

Hungarian citizens were made eligible for eVisas by Guinea and Malawi (October 2019), Saudi Arabia (September 2019), Suriname and Pakistan (April 2019), Tanzania and Papua New Guinea (November 2018), Ethiopia (1 June 2018), Angola (March 2018), Djibouti (February 2018), Egypt (December 2017), Azerbaijan (January 2017), Tajikistan (June 2016), India (August 2015) and Myanmar (October 2014).

The number of visa-free destinations for Hungarian citizens grew exponentially over the last few years, in 2009 Hungarian citizens could travel to 131 countries without a visa, to 142 in 2010, 153 in 2012 and 182 in 2020.

Visa requirements map

Visa requirements

Disputed areas, partially recognized countries and restricted zones
Visa requirements for Hungarian citizens for visits to various territories, disputed areas, partially recognized countries and restricted zones:

Diplomatic passports

A Hungarian ordinary passport, with visa-free access to all of the world's developed countries, is a very convenient travel document by international standards. However, it is not as handy as a Hungarian diplomatic passport, which has even less visa restrictions attached to it. Several countries offer visa-free access to holders of a Hungarian diplomatic passport, but not to ordinary passport holders. This is notably the case with the People's Republic of China since 1992, Russia (since 2001). and India (since 2003). As of July 2009, Hungarian diplomats can enter all G8+5 countries without a visa. The Hungarian diplomatic passport holds the distinction of being the only travel document in the world granting such visa-free entry to all G8+5 member states.

In total holders of various categories of official Hungarian passports have additional visa-free access to the following countries – Algeria (diplomatic passports), Azerbaijan (diplomatic or service passports), Belarus (diplomatic or service passports), China (diplomatic or service passports), Cuba (diplomatic or service passports), Egypt (diplomatic passports), India (diplomatic or official passports), Indonesia (diplomatic or service passports), Iran (diplomatic passports), Kazakhstan (diplomatic or service passports), Laos (diplomatic or official passports), Mongolia (diplomatic or official passports), Russia (diplomatic and service passports), Tajikistan (diplomatic or service passports), Turkmenistan (diplomatic or service passports) and Uzbekistan (diplomatic passports), Vietnam (diplomatic, official, service or special passports), Yemen (diplomatic passports). Holders of diplomatic or service passports of any country have visa-free access to Cape Verde, Ethiopia, Mali and Zimbabwe.

Right to consular protection in non-EU countries

When they are in a territory with no Hungarian consular facilities, because Hungarian citizens are also citizens of the EU, they have the right to get consular assistance from any other EU country with a diplomatic mission in that territory.

Non-visa restrictions

See also

Visa requirements for European Union citizens
Hungarian passport
Hungarian identity card
Visa policy of the Schengen Area

References and Notes
References

Notes

Hungary
Foreign relations of Hungary